Cyrebia is a genus of moths of the family Noctuidae.

Species
 Cyrebia anachoreta (Herrich-Schäffer, 1851)
 Cyrebia luperinoides Guenée, 1852

References
Natural History Museum Lepidoptera genus database
Cyrebia at funet

Noctuinae